The 2012–13 Slovak First Football League (known as the Slovak Corgoň Liga for sponsorship reasons) was the 20th season of first-tier football league in Slovakia, since its establishment in 1993. The season started on 14 July 2012 and ended on 26 May 2013. MŠK Žilina were the defending champions.

Teams
A total of 12 teams competed in the league, including 11 sides from the 2011–12 season and one promoted from the 2. liga. The promoted team was Spartak Myjava which made their Slovak First Football League debut. They replaced DAC Dunajská Streda.

Stadia and locations

Personnel and sponsorship

Adidas is the official ball supplier for Corgoň Liga.

Managerial changes

League table

Results 
The schedule consisted of three rounds. The two first rounds consisted of a conventional home and away round-robin schedule. The pairings of the third round were set according to the 2010–11 final standings. Every team played each opponent once for a total of 11 games per team.

First and second round

Third round

Top scorers
Updated through matches played on 26 May 2013.

Awards

Top Eleven

Goalkeeper:  Matúš Putnocký (ŠK Slovan)
Defence:   Mamadou Bagayoko (ŠK Slovan),  Jozef Piaček (MŠK Žilina),  Nicolas Ezequiel Gorosito (Šk Slovan),  Tomáš Hučko (Dukla B.Bystrica)
Midfield:  Igor Žofčák (ŠK Slovan),  Tomáš Kóňa (FK Senica),  Tomáš Ďubek (MŠK Ružomberok),   Marko Milinković (ŠK Slovan)
Attack:  Lester Peltier (ŠK Slovan),  Andrej Hodek (FC ViOn)

Individual Awards

Manager of the season
Samuel Slovák (ŠK Slovan)

Player of the Year
Tomáš Ďubek (MŠK Ružomberok)

Young player of the Year
Stanislav Lobotka (AS Trenčín)

See also
2012–13 Slovak Cup
2012–13 2. Liga (Slovakia)

Stats 
 List of foreign players
 List of transfers summer 2012
 List of transfers winter 2012–13

References

Slovak
2012-13
1